In mathematics, the Johnson–Lindenstrauss lemma is a result named after William B. Johnson and Joram Lindenstrauss concerning low-distortion embeddings of points from high-dimensional into low-dimensional Euclidean space. The lemma states that a set of points in a high-dimensional space can be embedded into a space of much lower dimension in such a way that distances between the points are nearly preserved. The map used for the embedding is at least Lipschitz, and can even be taken to be an orthogonal projection.

The lemma has applications in compressed sensing, manifold learning, dimensionality reduction, and graph embedding. Much of the data stored and manipulated on computers, including text and images, can be represented as points in a high-dimensional space (see vector space model for the case of text). However, the essential algorithms for working with such data tend to become bogged down very quickly as dimension increases.  It is therefore desirable to reduce the dimensionality of the data in a way that preserves its relevant structure. The Johnson–Lindenstrauss lemma is a classic result in this vein.

Also, the lemma is tight up to a constant factor, i.e. there exists a set of points of size m that needs dimension

Lemma 

 

for all .

The formula can be rearranged:

Alternatively, for any  and any integer  there exists a linear function  such that the restriction  is -bi-Lipschitz.

An orthogonal projection will, in general, reduce the average distance between points, but the lemma can be viewed as dealing with relative distances, which do not change under scaling. In a nutshell, you roll the dice and obtain a random projection, which will reduce the average distance, and then you scale up the distances so that the average distance returns to its previous value. If you keep rolling the dice, you will, in polynomial random time, find a projection for which the (scaled) distances satisfy the lemma.

Alternate statement 
A related lemma is the distributional JL lemma.
 

Speeding up the JL transform 
Given A, computing the matrix vector product takes  time. There has been some work in deriving distributions for which the matrix vector product can be computed in less than  time.

There are two major lines of work. The first, Fast Johnson Lindenstrauss Transform (FJLT), was introduced by Ailon and Chazelle in 2006.
This method allows the computation of the matrix vector product in just  for any constant .

Another approach is to build a distribution supported over matrices that are sparse.
This method allows keeping only an  fraction of the entries in the matrix, which means the computation can be done in just  time.
Furthermore, if the vector has only  non-zero entries, the Sparse JL takes time , which may be much less than the  time used by Fast JL.

Tensorized random projections 
It is possible to combine two JL matrices by taking the so-called face-splitting product, which is defined as the tensor products of the rows (was proposed by V. Slyusar in 1996 for radar and digital antenna array applications).
More directly, let  and  be two matrices.
Then the face-splitting product  is

This idea of tensorization was used by Kasiviswanathan et al. 2010 for differential privacy.

JL matrices defined like this use fewer random bits, and can be applied quickly to vectors that have tensor structure, due to the following identity:
,
where  is the element-wise (Hadamard) product.
Such computations have been used to efficiently compute polynomial kernels and many other .

In 2020 it was shown that if the matrices  are independent  or Gaussian matrices, the combined matrix  satisfies the distributional JL lemma if the number of rows is at least  
.

For large  this is as good as the completely random Johnson-Lindenstrauss, but
Alternative JL constructions are suggested to circumvent this.

See also 
Random projection
Restricted isometry property

Notes

References

Further reading
. Journal version of a paper previously appearing at PODC 2001.
.
.
 
 
 

Lemmas
Metric geometry